Capodimonte (lit. "head of [the] mountain") is an Italian placename. It may refer to:

, an area of Naples which includes:
, the major park of Naples which was laid out for Charles III of the House of Bourbon in 1734
Palace of Capodimonte, a royal palace
Museo di Capodimonte, housed in the former Palace of Capodimonte
Astronomical Observatory of Capodimonte
Capodimonte porcelain manufactory
Capodimonte, Viterbo, a town and commune (municipality) on the shores of Lake Bolsena, Province of Viterbo, Lazio
Capo Di Monte, Hampstead, a Grade II listed house in Hampstead, London